The 1979 Texas Longhorns football team represented the University of Texas at Austin in the 1979 NCAA Division I-A football season.  The Longhorns finished the regular season with a 9–2 record and lost to Washington in the Sun Bowl.

Schedule

Roster

References

Texas
Texas Longhorns football seasons
Longhorns football